A by-election was held for the British House of Commons constituency of South East Staffordshire on 11 April 1996, following the death the previous December of the sitting Conservative MP Sir David Lightbown.

The result was a Labour gain from the Conservatives.

Results

Notes on candidates
News Bunny was a character on the cable channel Live TV. The candidate was an employee of the channel who changed his name for the purposes of the election.
The ballot paper description of the candidate N Samuelson was "Daily Loonylugs Earing Up the World".
News Bunny was arrested during the campaign for obstructing the highway.  He was filmed by BBC Midlands Today handing carrots out to motorists as part of his electioneering. The BBC captured the memorable line, spoken by a female police officer to a male police officer, "Get that rabbit".

See also
List of United Kingdom by-elections
List of parliamentary constituencies in Staffordshire

References

External links
Campaign literature from the by-election

By-elections to the Parliament of the United Kingdom in Staffordshire constituencies
1996 elections in the United Kingdom
1996 in England
1990s in Staffordshire
April 1996 events in the United Kingdom